Sermey Khensur Lobsang Tharchin Rinpoche (1921– 1 December 2004) was a scholar of the Gelug school of Tibetan Buddhism. He was born in Lhasa, Tibet.

References
 SERMEY KHENSUR LOBSANG THARCHIN RINPOCHE: 1921-2004

 The Mahayana Sutra and Tantra Press

The Mahayana Sutra & Tantra Press was founded under the guidance of our revered spiritual teacher, Sermey Khensur Rinpoche Geshe Lobsang Tharchin.  Khensur Rinpoche first came to the United States in April 1972;  he continued to live and teach here for more than 30 years.  He was one of the most senior Tibetan Buddhist masters to bring the holy teachings of Tibetan Buddhism to the west. The press has published a number of Khen Rinpoche's translations of Buddhist classics, along with several of his own oral commentaries.

Lamas
1921 births
2004 deaths
Rinpoches
Gelug Lamas
Date of birth missing